Sara Rowbotham is a local councillor, community leader and former health worker in Rochdale, Greater Manchester, notable for helping to expose the child sex abuse ring there. She has served as Deputy leader of Rochdale Borough Council since 2018, and was first elected to represent North Middleton in 2015.  She is also the Cabinet Member for Health and Wellbeing. She is a member of the Labour Party.

Rowbotham was born in Middleton, Greater Manchester. Both her parents were socialists.

Between 2004 and 2014, she worked for the Rochdale Crisis Intervention Team for the NHS, which is when she uncovered the Rochdale child sex abuse ring and helped bring the perpetrators to court. As a front line sexual health worker, who led the NHS crisis team, she made 181 referrals detailing the abuse and sexual grooming of young people between 2005 and 2011. In 2012, she told the Rochdale inquiry her bosses had ignored scores of warnings that girls were being groomed and sexually exploited. She was made redundant two years later, in 2014. She was portrayed in Three Girls, a BBC mini-series about the Rochdale child sex abuse ring, by actress Maxine Peake. Following the screening in mid-May 2017, a petition was started at Change.org calling for her to be formally recognized for her services to Rochdale community. By late May, it had gathered more than 275,000 signatures.

In May 2017, she featured on an episode of First Dates. She received a Special Recognition at the 2018 NHS Heroes Awards, and was made an honorary member of the Council of the National Society for the Prevention of Cruelty to Children (NSPCC) in October 2018.

References

Living people
Labour Party (UK) councillors
Councillors in Greater Manchester
People from Rochdale
Year of birth missing (living people)
Women councillors in England